The 1997 UEFA Champions League final was a football match played at the Olympiastadion in Munich on 28 May 1997 to determine the winner of the 1996–97 UEFA Champions League. The match was contested by Borussia Dortmund of Germany and Juventus of Italy. Borussia Dortmund won 3–1 with goals from Karl-Heinz Riedle and Lars Ricken; Juventus' goal was scored by Alessandro Del Piero.

Route to the final

In their first semi-final in Europe's premier tournament since 1964, Dortmund defeated Manchester United, who themselves had not reached that stage since 1969.

In the other half of the draw, Juventus easily overcame Ajax, the same team they had beaten on penalties in the previous year's final.

Previous meetings

The match featured the same teams that competed in the 1993 UEFA Cup Final, in which Juventus prevailed 6–1 over two legs. Their two German players in that final, Jürgen Kohler and Andreas Möller, had since moved to Dortmund along with the Brazilian Júlio César (who did not feature in the 1997 final), while another two Dortmund players who did play in Munich – Stefan Reuter and Paulo Sousa – were also former Juventus players, and Matthias Sammer and Karl-Heinz Riedle had previously played in Italy's Serie A (the latter's replacement at Lazio was Alen Bokšić, who by 1997 had moved to Juventus).

Goalkeepers Angelo Peruzzi and his understudy Michelangelo Rampulla were the only Juventus players from 1993 in the squad for the 1997 final (Moreno Torricelli and Antonio Conte were still at the club but were not involved), with the aforementioned Kohler and Möller having switched sides. In the Dortmund squad their goalkeeper Stefan Klos, striker Stéphane Chapuisat and midfielders René Tretschok, Reuter and club captain Michael Zorc remained from four years earlier.

Besides the 1993 showpiece, the clubs had also met in the semi-finals of the 1994–95 UEFA Cup with Juventus progressing to the final which they lost to Parma, and in the group stage of the 1995–96 UEFA Champions League, with each club winning away from home, however Juventus topped the group and went on to win the trophy.

In the years to follow, Juventus and Borussia Dortmund would not meet again until 2014–15 Champions League round of 16 – the Italian club went through, meaning they won all four fixtures (1993, 1995 UEFA Cup, 1995 and 2015 Champions League) at Dortmund's Westfalenstadion, with their only defeat on German soil was in this final. Juventus reached that season's final; coincidentally that match was again held at an Olympiastadion in Germany, but this time in Berlin, and the outcome was another 3–1 loss, to Barcelona.

Match

Summary
Karl-Heinz Riedle put Dortmund ahead finishing from inside the six yard box after Paul Lambert's cross. Riedle then made it two with a header from a corner kick from the right.

In the second half, Juventus forward Alessandro Del Piero, who had come on as a substitute, scored via a back-heel from a cross by Alen Bokšić to make the score 2–1.

20-year-old substitute and Dortmund local boy Lars Ricken latched on to a through-pass by Andreas Möller only 16 seconds after coming onto the pitch. Ricken chipped Angelo Peruzzi in the Juve goal from over 20 yards with his first touch of the ball, to make it 3–1 for Dortmund. Ricken's goal was the fastest ever by a substitute in said event.

With Zinedine Zidane unable to make an impression for Juve against the close marking of Lambert, the 3–1 victory gave Dortmund their only Champions League title to date.

Details

See also
1993 UEFA Cup Final – contested between same teams
1996–97 UEFA Champions League
Borussia Dortmund in European football
Juventus F.C. in European football

References

External links
1996–97 UEFA Champions League at UEFA.com

1996–97 in German football
1997
European Cup Final 1997
European Cup Final 1997
European Cup Final 1997
Final
1990s in Munich
May 1997 sports events in Europe
Football in Munich
Sports competitions in Munich